Per Lothar Lindtner (born 1947) is a Norwegian politician. Lindtner was the head of the Communist Party of Norway from 1993 to 2001, serving in a collective leadership with Terje Krogh and Kjell Underlid from 1993 to 1998, and with Underlid from 1998 to 2000. He is a member of the party's Hordaland unit. He headed the party's ticket in Hordaland in the 2001 Norwegian parliamentary election. 

Lindtner is the son of the actor Lothar Lindtner and the brother of the actor Lasse Lindtner. He is married to Unni Hovden.

References

1947 births
Living people
Communist Party of Norway politicians
Leaders of political parties in Norway